This article is a list of horror films originally released in the 2020s. Often there may be considerable overlap particularly between horror and other genres (including, thriller, suspense, slasher, and sci-fi); the list should attempt to document films which are more closely related to horror, even if they bend genres.

List of horror films of the 2020s
 List of horror films of 2020
 List of horror films of 2021
 List of horror films of 2022
 List of horror films of 2023

Upcoming

2024

2025

TBA

References

2020s
Horror